Altered reality may refer to:
 Recreational drug use
 Augmented reality